Diaditus is a genus of assassin bugs in the family Reduviidae. There are about six described species in Diaditus.

Species
These six species belong to the genus Diaditus:
 Diaditus latulus Barber, 1930
 Diaditus nocturnus Hussey, 1954
 Diaditus pictipes Champion, 1898
 Diaditus pilosicornis Bergroth, 1907
 Diaditus semicolon Stål, 1859
 Diaditus tejanus Giacchi, 1980

References

Further reading

 
 

Reduviidae
Articles created by Qbugbot